Afif al-Bizri (1914 – 28 January 1994) was a Syrian career military officer who served as the chief of staff of the Syrian Army between 1957–1959. He was known for his communist sympathies, and for spearheading the union movement between Syria and Egypt in 1958.

Career
After graduating from the Military Academy of Damascus, in 1935, Afif al-Bizri pursued advanced military training in France. His time there is credited with exposure to communism, where he met several French communists. He never officially joined the Syrian Communist Party, but was said to hold "radical Marxist views".

In 1941, he left to Iraq and joined Rashid Ali al-Gaylani's revolt against the British. He returned to Syria after Gaylani's revolt was suppressed by the British. He served in the French-created "Troupe Speciale," but deserted his post to join the Syrian rebels in 1945, which led to his arrest and deportation to Lebanon by the French authorities.

After Syria's independence in 1946, Bizri resumed his military career as an instructor of topography at the Homs Military Academy. He fought as a volunteer in the 1948 Arab–Israeli War, and was appointed by then-Chief of Staff of the Syrian Army, Husni al-Zaim, to the delegation that negotiated the Syrian-Israeli armistice agreement of 1949.

Pan-Arabism by Gamal Abdal Nasser

Starting in the mid-1950s, Bizri was advocating a socialist ideology in the army. After Egyptian president Gamal Abdel Nasser allied himself with the Soviet Union, Bizri joined his Arab nationalism movement, and was later appointed by President Shukri al-Quwatli, as chief of staff of the Syrian Army, as an appeasement to Nasser. His term was characterized with the spread of Pan-Arabism in the Syrian Army ranks. Many of the officers who were promoted under him were loyal to Nasser. He also clashed with anti-Nasser politicians including Minister of Defense Khalid al-Azm and Prime Minister Sabri al-Assali, whom was forced to follow a pro-Nasser policy under threat of arrest.

In 1957, he led a military tribunal into what came to be known as the "Iraqi Conspiracy." The tribunal accused many anti-Nasser politicians with receiving illicit funds from anti-Nasser Arab governments including Iraq, Jordan and Lebanon, as well as plotting the assassination of Nasserist and Socialist leaders including Abdel Hamid al-Sarraj, Akram al-Hawrani, Khalid Bakdash, and Afif al-Bizri. The tribunal handed down death sentences to twelve politicians including members of the parliament, Adnan al-Atassi and Mikhail Ilyan. The sentences were commuted after the intervention of Arab governments, Great Britain, and President Quwatly.

Bizri led the officer delegation that pleaded with Nasser for a full union between Syria and Egypt in 1958. He personally participated in the talks that eventually led to the establishment of the United Arab Republic on February 1, 1958. However, Bizri fell out with Nasser soon after the union because Nasser appointed his friend Egyptian General Abdel Hakim Amer as governor of Syria. Nasser distrusted Bizri's communist leanings, and eventually dismissed him from office in June 1959, and outlawed the communist party soon after.

Bizri supported the 1961 coup that brought down the UAR. He returned to Syria from his exile, but was refused a post in the army due to his history.

References

1914 births
1994 deaths
Chiefs of Staff of the Syrian Army
Nasserists
People from Sidon
Syrian Arab nationalists
Syrian communists